The 2019 Trafford Metropolitan Borough Council election to elect members of Trafford Metropolitan Borough Council in England took place on 2 May 2019. This was on the same day as other local elections.

One third of the council stood for election, with each successful candidate serving a four-year term of office, expiring in 2023. Prior to the election the Council had been in a state of no overall control, with the Labour Party running a minority administration through a confidence and supply arrangement with The Liberal Democrats. In the election the Labour Party gained six seats and were therefore capable of forming a majority administration thereafter.

After the election, the composition of the council was:

Election Results

Overall election result

Overall result compared with 2018.

By ward
Asterisk denotes the sitting councillor.

Altrincham ward

Ashton upon Mersey ward

Bowdon ward

Broadheath ward

Brooklands ward

Bucklow-St. Martins ward

Clifford ward

Davyhulme East ward

Davyhulme West ward

Flixton ward

Gorse Hill ward

Hale Barns ward

Hale Central ward

Longford ward

Priory ward

Sale Moor ward

St. Mary's ward

Stretford ward

Timperley ward

Urmston ward

Village ward

References

2019 English local elections
2019
2010s in Greater Manchester
May 2019 events in the United Kingdom